Lawrence Grossberg (born December 3, 1947) is an American scholar of cultural studies and popular culture whose work focuses primarily on popular music and the politics of youth in the United States. He is widely known for his research in the philosophy of communication and culture.
Though his scholarship focused significantly throughout the 1980s and early 1990s on the politics of postmodernism, his more recent work explores the possibilities and limitations of alternative and emergent formations of modernity.

Biography
Born on December 3, 1947, and raised in Brooklyn, New York, Grossberg went to Stuyvesant High School. In 1968 he graduated summa cum laude in history and philosophy from the University of Rochester, where he studied with Hayden White. Afterwards, he trained under Richard Hoggart and Stuart Hall at the Centre for Contemporary Cultural Studies at the University of Birmingham, England.

After two years of traveling through Europe with Les Treteaux Libres, a French-speaking theater company, Grossberg returned to the United States for doctoral studies in communication research (with James W. Carey) at the University of Illinois at Urbana-Champaign.  There, he received a PhD in speech communication in 1976.  His doctoral dissertation, which he now largely repudiates, was entitled, Dialectical Hermeneutics and the Human Sciences.  Grossberg taught briefly at Purdue University in West Lafayette, Indiana (1975-1976), before returning to the University of Illinois as assistant professor of speech communication in 1976.  At the University of Illinois he supported founding the Unit for Criticism and Interpretive Theory.  He was promoted to the rank of associate professor in 1982, and in 1990 achieved the rank of Professor of Speech Communication.

Currently, he is Emeritus Professor of Communication at UNC.

His published books include It's a Sin: Essays on Postmodernism, Politics and Culture (1988), We Gotta Get Out of This Place: Popular Conservatism and Postmodern Culture (1992), Bringing it All Back Home: Essays on Cultural Studies (1997), Dancing in Spite of Myself: Essays in Popular Culture (1997), Caught in the Crossfire: Kids, Politics and America's Future (2005), and Cultural Studies in the Future Tense (2010).  Grossberg is co-author of MediaMaking: Mass Media in a Popular Culture (2005) and About Raymond Williams (2010), and co-edited (with Cary Nelson and Paula Treichler) Cultural Studies. He has also published more than one hundred articles and essays. Grossberg serves on the editorial collective of Public Culture, among many other academic journals. He was also editor of the journal Cultural Studies from 1990 to 2019. His work, including a number of collections, has been translated into ten languages.

Grossberg has stated that Stuart Hall was the godfather to his only son.

Bibliography

Books

Journal articles

References

Further reading
Louisville - Biographical information on Lawrence Grossberg
Lawrence Grossberg faculty page at UNC-Chapel Hill
German interview
“Being young sucks: an interview (with Lawrence Grossberg)”, Bad Subjects 74 (2006)

People from Brooklyn
Stuyvesant High School alumni
University of Rochester alumni
1947 births
Living people
Alumni of the University of Birmingham